The chairperson of the Legislative Duma of Khabarovsk Krai is the presiding officer of that legislature.

Office-holders

References 

Lists of legislative speakers in Russia
Politics of Khabarovsk Krai